Northeast Airlines (NEA) – known as BKS Air Transport until 1970 – was an airline based in the United Kingdom that operated from 1952 until 1976, when NEA's operations and fleet were merged into British Airways.

History

BKS

The airline commenced operations in February 1952 from its base at Southend Airport as BKS Aero Charter flying a Douglas DC-3 (BKS were the founders' initials – i.e. James Barnby, T D 'Mike' Keegan and Cyril Stevens.) Further Dakotas were bought in 1952. For a couple of years it flew charters and freight until 1953, when it was granted permission to operate scheduled services between Newcastle, the Isle of Man and Jersey. The Dakotas continued in operation with 3BKS until the last of eight was sold in 1967. The airline's name was changed to BKS Air Transport at the end of 1953.

To expand, three Vickers VC.1 Vikings were acquired in 1955 to operate flights to Málaga. The next aircraft type was the pressurised Airspeed Ambassador. It was operated from 1957 and enabled the introduction of longer range scheduled services to Basle, Belfast, Bilbao, Dublin and Santander.

As the network grew, more scheduled flights were added, including Newcastle to London and other routes. In 1958 the Bristol 170 Freighter was added, followed by the Vickers Viscount in 1961. Further expansion in and out of London saw the introduction of the Hawker Siddeley HS 748 in 1962 and the Bristol Britannia in 1964.

By the mid-1960s, London Heathrow had become BKS's busiest operational base with scheduled domestic flights to Leeds/Bradford, Teesside and Newcastle, as well as international scheduled services to Bilbao, Biarritz, and Bordeaux.

The first jet aircraft in the BKS fleet were two Hawker Siddeley Tridents, which were acquired in April 1969. These served the Newcastle-Heathrow route, as well as on inclusive tour charters from Newcastle and London to Mediterranean destinations. Two further Tridents were acquired later.

BKS and Cambrian Airways formed the "British Air Services" group in 1967. British Air Services was a holding company 70% owned by British European Airways and 30% by the former shareholders of BKS and Cambrian.

Northeast Airlines
The airline's name was changed to Northeast Airlines on 1 November 1970. In July 1973, the airline became part of the British Airways group. By 1976 Northeast had been fully integrated into British Airways. The last Northeast flights operated on 31 March 1976.

Historical fleet

Airspeed Ambassador
Bristol Britannia
Bristol 170 Freighter
Douglas DC-3
Hawker Siddeley HS 748
Hawker Siddeley HS.121 Trident
Vickers VC.1 Viking
Vickers Viscount 700/800

Accidents and incidents

On 3 July 1968, Flight 6845 crashed at London Heathrow Airport when a flap actuating rod failed due to metal fatigue.  Six of the eight on board and eight horses being transported were killed. Two Hawker Siddeley Tridents were hit by the crashing Ambassador.
On 17 October 1961, a BKS Dakota (G-AMVC) en route from Yeadon to Crosby, crashed on Croglin Fell in the North Pennines in strong winds, heavy rain and poor visibility. All four crew (the only occupants) were killed.

In literature

BKS Air Transport is featured heavily in the biography Behind the Cockpit Door by Arthur Whitlock, a first officer and subsequent captain who served with the airline for just over two decades. The main section of the book charts the airline's development from its origins at Southend Aerodrome in the early 1950s to its merger with British Airways in the 1970s.

See also
 List of defunct airlines of the United Kingdom

References
Notes

Bibliography

 

British Airways Archives and Museum Collection (1951–1970)

External links

History of BKS
Fleet and code details
Timetable images

 
Defunct airlines of the United Kingdom
Airlines established in 1951
Airlines disestablished in 1976
1951 establishments in the United Kingdom